Augustine Commission may refer to either of two committees chaired by Norman Ralph Augustine:
 1990 - Advisory Committee on the Future of the United States Space Program
 2009 - Review of United States Human Space Flight Plans Committee